Tofig Heydarov (born 16 July 1972) is an Azerbaijani weightlifter. He competed in the men's light heavyweight event at the 1996 Summer Olympics.

References

External links
 

1972 births
Living people
Azerbaijani male weightlifters
Olympic weightlifters of Azerbaijan
Weightlifters at the 1996 Summer Olympics
Place of birth missing (living people)